Petaloptyon danei is a goblet-shaped hexactinellid sponge known from rare fragments from the Middle Cambrian Burgess Shale. A few specimens of Petaloptyon are known from the Greater Phyllopod bed, where they comprise under 0.01% of the community.

The fragments show the living animal had a stalk, and had panels with a lattice pattern.

References

External links 
 Burgess Shale species 100

Burgess Shale fossils
Burgess Shale sponges
Prehistoric sponge genera
Fossil taxa described in 1931

Cambrian genus extinctions